Deepika Meena Joseph is an Indian professional international kabaddi player. She was a member of the team that won a (gold medal) in the 2010 Asian games in Guangzhou.

Deepika represented team India For the first time in the 2007 Asian championship when she was 16 years old.

She played SAF games 2010 in Bangladesh (gold medal), Indoor Asian games 2013 Korea (gold medal). Currently playing for the country as a vice captain; won SAF games 2019 in Nepal.

Early life
Deepika was raised by her mother Mrs Meena Joseph single-handedly.

Career
She was the vice captain of 1st at the Women's world cup winning team in (Patna) Bihar.

Deepika represented team India in 2013 for the indoor Asian games and played SAF games in 2010 where she won a gold medal.  Deepika played SAF games 2019 in Nepal Kathmandu and won the gold medal.

Deepika suffered many injuries, financial instability but still made a comeback.

References

Living people
Indian kabaddi players
Asian Games medalists in kabaddi
Kabaddi players at the 2010 Asian Games
Year of birth missing (living people)
Asian Games gold medalists for India
Medalists at the 2010 Asian Games
Place of birth missing (living people)